Jawani Diwani is a 2006 Hindi adult drama film directed by Maneesh Sharma starring Emraan Hashmi, Celina Jaitly, Hrishitaa Bhatt, Tiku Talsania and Mahesh Manjrekar.

Plot
Mannjit "Mann" Kapoor, is an aspiring singer living a middle-class lifestyle in India. He is however unsuccessful in finding any recording labels to back his aspirations. He wants to secure a contract with Umesh Jumani, who is the managing director of a recording company, and in order to do this he sets his sights on wooing Umesh's attractive daughter, Radha. He succeeds in getting her to fall in love with him, and proposes marriage to her, thereby securing a contract with Umesh's company to record an album. He is all set to marry Radha, and finally sees his dream of being a successful singer within his grasp.

With his impending marriage in sight, his friends arrange for a bachelor party in the province of Goa, a scenic beach area in India. While partying with all of them he happens to meet, and fall head over heels in love with a girl named Roma Fernandes who coincidentally, also Is an aspiring singer and dancer. Roma reciprocates his feelings, but is heart-broken upon learning that he is engaged and soon will be marrying Radha. Torn between his love for Roma and the commitment he made with Radha, a lovelorn Mann returns home from Goa, not knowing that his life is about to be turned upside down once Radha and Umesh find out about his dalliance with Roma. In the midst of all this upheaval, things are complicated further when he has a confrontation with an underworld don, Chappu Bhai, who wants Mann to honour his feelings toward Roma, and intends to make sure that he marries her and not Radha, no matter the consequence.

Cast
 Emraan Hashmi as Mannjit "Mann" Kapoor 
 Celina Jaitly as Roma Fernendes 
 Tiku Talsania as Umesh Jumani
 Hrishitaa Bhatt as Radha U. Jumani
 Mahesh Manjrekar as Chappu Bhai
 Sherlyn Chopra as Mona
 Mushtaq Khan as Iqbal Hussain
 Shehzad Khan as Mannu Malik
 D. Santosh as Pandu

Music

The soundtrack of the film is composed by Sajid–Wajid while the lyrics are penned by Shabbir Ahmed. The song "Sini ne sini ne" has some similarities with I'm a Slave 4 U from album Britney by Britney Spears.

Critical response
Taran Adarsh of IndiaFM gave the film 1 star out of 5, writing ″Emraan tries hard to infuse life in JAWANI DIWANI, but in vain. The actor is capable of much more, but even a sincere performance from him cannot uplift things. Celina shows improvement in dramatic sequences, but needs to work on emotional ones. Hrishitaa doesn't get much scope. Mahesh Manjrekar just doesn't work. He hams throughout. Tiku Talsania is loud. Shehzad Khan does a takeoff on Anu Malik well. On the whole, JAWANI DIWANI cuts a sorry picture. At the box-office, a poor show all the way!″  Vipin Vijayan of Rediff.com ″If you can fathom the double-meaning dialogues a la Kyaa Kool Hai Hum and Masti, then you might sit through the first half. For those who like skin show, you may even manage to sit through the second half. But for those who want to watch a good movie, sorry boss, this is a complete waste of time, money and patience.″

References

External links
 

2006 films
2000s Hindi-language films
Films scored by Sajid–Wajid
Films directed by Maneesh Sharma